Energy in Armenia is mostly from natural gas. Armenia has no proven reserves of oil or natural gas and currently imports most of its gas from Russia. The Iran-Armenia Natural Gas Pipeline has the capacity to equal imports from Russia.

Despite a lack of fossil fuel, Armenia has significant domestic electricity generation resources. The Armenian electrical energy sector has had a surplus capacity ever since emerging from a severe post-Soviet crisis in the mid-1990s thanks to the reopening of the nuclear power station at Metsamor. The Metsamor Nuclear Power Plant provides 42.9% of the country's electricity. Armenia has plans to build a new NPP in order to replace the aging Metsamor which was built in 1979. The country also has eleven hydroelectric power plants and has plans to build a geothermal power plant in Syunik. Most of the rest of Armenia's electricity is generated by the natural gas-fired thermal power plants in Yerevan (completed in 2010) and Hrazdan.

Upon gaining independence, Armenia signed the European Energy Charter in December 1991, the charter is now known as the Energy Charter Treaty which promotes integration of global energy markets. Armenia is also a partner country of the EU INOGATE energy programme, which has four key topics: enhancing energy security, convergence of member state energy markets on the basis of EU internal energy market principles, supporting sustainable energy development, and attracting investment for energy projects of common and regional interest. Since 2011, Armenia holds observer member status in the EU's Energy Community.

History and geopolitics 
Before the USSR collapsed, oil imports made up about half of Armenia's primary energy supply of 8000 ktoe (compare to 3100 ktoe in 2016).

Back then, oil made its way to Armenia via a direct rail link from Armenia-Georgia-Russia, but since the Abkhazia-Georgia border is closed fuel is transported across the Black Sea to Georgia from where it makes its way to Armenia via rail cars. Further restriction to Armenian oil imports represents economic blockade maintained by Azerbaijan to the East, and Turkey to the West. The blockade began shortly after the outbreak of the First Nagorno-Karabakh War and was upheld ever since, despite a cease fire agreement in 1994.

Rankings 
Armenia was ranked 43rd among 125 countries at Energy Trilemma Index in 2018. The index ranks countries on their ability to provide sustainable energy through 3 dimensions: Energy security, Energy equity (accessibility and affordability), Environmental sustainability.

Primary energy supply 
Total primary energy supply in Armenia in 2016 amounted to 3025 ktoe (1000 tonnes of oil equivalent). This roughly matches or surpasses production of previous years. TPES included Production (963 ktoe), Imports (2235 ktoe), Exports (-122 ktoe), International Marine Bunkers (0 ktoe), International Aviation Bunkers (-45 ktoe), Stock Changes (-5 ktoe). Armenia's Total Final Consumption is 2120 (ktoe), Losses -180 (ktoe), Industry 320 (ktoe), Transport 622 (ktoe) and Residential 786 (ktoe).

Natural reserves 
Armenia has no proven oil or gas reserves.  Earlier explorations failed to deliver satisfactory results in the past .

In 2018 new permits for oil and gas exploration were issued to Tashir Group affiliated companies.

Oil 
According to Statistical Committee of Armenia no oil was imported in 2016, but rather its refinement products.

Proposed Iranian pipeline 
Armenian and Iranian authorities have for years been discussing an oil pipeline (distinct from the existing Iran-Armenia natural gas pipeline) that will pump Iranian oil products to Armenia. As of early 2011, no concrete dates have been set for the construction.  Armenian Energy Minister Armen Movsisian has said that the construction will take two years and cost Armenia about $100 million.  Earlier Iran's oil minister said that the 365-kilometer pipeline could go on stream by 2014.  Iran plans to export 1.5 million liters of gasoline and diesel fuel a day to Armenia through the pipeline; Armenia's annual demand for refined oil products stands at around 400,000 metric tons.

Natural gas 

Natural gas represents a large portion of total energy consumption in Armenia, accounting for 50% and is the primary means of winter heating in the country.

Gazprom Armenia (owned by the Russian gas giant Gazprom) owns the natural gas pipeline network within Armenia and holds a monopoly over the import and distribution of natural gas to consumers and businesses.

Armenia's thermal power stations (which supply approximately 24% of its electricity) run on natural gas, making Armenia (at the present time) dependent on imported Russian gas.

Russian-Georgian pipeline 
The Russian gas export monopoly Gazprom supplies Armenia with gas through a pipeline that runs through Georgia. In 2007, Gazprom provided Armenia with just under 2 billion cubic meters of natural gas.  As a transit fee, Armenia pays Georgia approximately 10% of the gas that was destined to reach Armenia.  Russian natural gas supplies to Georgia and Armenia are provided by two main pipelines: the North Caucasus-Transcaucasus pipeline (1,200 mm diameter) and the Mozdok-Tbilisi pipeline (700 mm diameter).

In 2008, Armenia imported 2.2 billion cubic meters of natural gas from Russia.

Iranian pipeline 
A new gas pipeline, the Iran-Armenia Natural Gas Pipeline, was completed in October, 2008. It is owned and operated by Gazprom Armenia and links Armenia to neighboring Iran, which has the world's second largest natural gas reserve after Russia. It has a capacity to pump 2.3-2.5 billion cubic meters of Iranian gas per year. The Armenian Ministry of Energy said in 2008 that it "does not yet have a need" for Iranian gas.  Analysts said that Armenia's reluctance to import Iranian gas was a result of pressure from Russia which maintains a monopoly over Armenia's natural gas market.

Gazprom wholly owns a crucial 24-mile section of the pipeline which Armenia surrendered in exchange for natural gas supplies from Russia at prices well below the European average until 2009.  According to an analyst, Armenia "effectively bargained away its future prospects for energy sources in return for cheaper prices now."  While Armenia could diversify its gas supply, with control of the Iran-Armenia gas pipeline, Gazprom now controls the competitors' supply.

In 2009 Armenia was importing 1-1.5 million cubic meters of Iranian natural gas, paying for this by electricity exports. 

Armenia receives about 370 million cubic meters of gas a year from Iran, which is converted into electricity and is sent back to Iran.

Gas from Turkmenistan might be supplied via Iran.

Pricing 

According to the agreements reached in 2017 by Karapetyan government gas import price stands at $150 for one thousand cubic meters throughout year 2018. Gazprom Armenia sells it to Armenian households at almost $300.

Electricity 

Since 1996 three main energy sources for electricity generation in Armenia were natural gas, nuclear power and hydropower.

Despite a lack of fossil fuel, Armenia has significant domestic electricity generation resources.  In 2006, non-thermal domestic electricity generation accounted for 76% of total generation: 43% nuclear and 33% hydroelectric.  In comparison, in 2002, these numbers were 56%, 32%, and 26%.

In 2006, Armenia's power plants generated a total of 5,940.9 million KWh of electricity of which 5,566.7 million KWh were delivered (374.2 million KWh – or 6.3% – was consumed by the producing plants).  Thus, in 2006, Armenia's power plants on average generated 678.2 MW of power, while the country's electricity consumption rate on average was 635.5 MW.

Armenia has a total of 11 power stations and 17 220 kV substations.  A map of Armenia's National Electricity Transmission Grid can be found at the website of the Global Energy Network Institute here .

Nuclear 
Armenia operates one Soviet-designed VVER-440 nuclear unit at Metsamor, which supplies over 40% of the country's energy needs. The EU and Turkey have expressed concern about the continuing operation of the plant. The Armenian energy minister has announced that a US$2 billion feasibility study of a new 1,000 MWe nuclear power plant is to be carried out in cooperation with Russia, the United States and the IAEA. Russia has agreed to build the plant in return for minority ownership of it. Furthermore, the USA has signalled its commitment to help Armenia with preliminary studies.
Armenia's Metsamor Nuclear Power Plant has an installed capacity of 815 MW, though only one unit of 407.5 MW is currently in operation.

Because Turkey, despite its WTO obligation, blockades Armenian borders, nuclear fuel is flown in from Russia.  Used fuel is sent back to Russia.

Armenia signed a cooperation agreement with the European Organization for Nuclear Research in March 1994. Since 2018, Armenia has also signed a cooperation agreement with the European Atomic Energy Community.

Thermal 

During 2010–2017 thermal power plants (running on imported natural gas from Russia and Iran) provided about one-third of Armenia's electricity.

Thermal power plants (running on natural gas) in Armenia have an established capacity of 1,756 MW.

The following table lists thermal power plants which together account for 24% of Armenia's domestic electricity generation.

In April 2010, a new natural gas-fired thermal power plant was inaugurated in Yerevan, making it the first major energy facility built in the country since independence.  The plant will reportedly allow Armenia to considerably cut back on use of natural gas for electricity production, because officials say it will also be twice as efficient as the plant's decommissioned unit and four other Soviet-era facilities of its kind functioning in the central Armenian town of Hrazdan.  With a capacity of 242 megawatts, its gas-powered turbine will be able to generate approximately one-quarter of Armenia's current (as of 2010) electricity output.  The state-of-the-art plant was built in Yerevan in place of an obsolete facility with a $247 million loan provided by the Japanese government through the Japan Bank of International Cooperation (JBIC). The long-term loan was disbursed to the Armenian government on concessional terms in 2007.

Armenia's energy sector will expand further after the ongoing construction of the Hrazdan thermal plant's new and even more powerful Fifth Unit. Russia's Gazprom monopoly acquired the incomplete facility in 2006 as part of a complex agreement with the Armenian government that raised its controlling stake in the Armenian gas distribution network to a commanding 80 percent. The Russian giant pledged to spend more than $200 million on finishing its protracted construction by 2011.

The new Yerevan and Hrazdan TPP facilities will pave the way for large-scale Armenian imports of natural gas from neighboring Iran through a pipeline constructed in late 2008. Armenia began receiving modest amounts of Iranian gas in May 2009. With Russian gas essentially meeting its domestic needs, it is expected that the bulk of that gas will be converted into electricity and exported to the Islamic Republic.

In late December 2010, the Armenian Energy Ministry announced that the fifth block of the Hrazdan thermal power plant will go online by April 2011.  Although construction on the fifth block began in the late 1980s, the Armenian government tried to unsuccessfully finish it in the late 1990s.  The current project is part of a 2006 deal between Gazprom and the Armenian government, in which Gazprom acquired the incomplete facility and increased its stake in Armenia's gas distribution network, in turn pledging to spend $200 million in completing the project by 2011.

Hydro 

Hydropower plants have an established capacity of 1,038 MW.

The economically justified hydropower potential of Armenia is around 3.600 GWh/year. From this amount, 1.500 GWh/year (or about 42% of economically justified hydropower potential) has been developed already.

Armenia has nine hydroelectric power plants which together accounted for one third of its domestic electricity generation.  The plants are grouped along two cascades:  the Sevan–Hrazdan Cascade and the Vorotan Cascade.  The following table lists the details of each cascade:

Planned projects 
Though both Iran and Armenia have long discussed opening a 140 MW, joint hydro power plant on the Artak’s River – Meghri HPP (also known as the Araks Hydro Power Plant) – by mid-2021, the project had not begun construction. Coupled with the 60 MW Loriberd HPP, these projects would add a cumulative generation of 1,012 million kWh/year.  The Meghri Hydro Power Plant is a joint Armenian-Iranian project slated to be constructed on the Araks River near Armenia's southern border town of Meghri.

In 2010, the energy ministers of Armenia and Iran signed a document on the long-anticipated construction of two hydropower stations on the Arax River. The agreement stipulates that the $323 million project will be fundamentally financed and operated by Iran, 793 million kWh of energy transported to Iran annually, and the stations transferred to Armenia's ownership 15 years later. Construction was expected to commence in 2011 and take five years to complete. By 2021, construction had not begun.

Small plants 
According to a USAID sponsored report, 313 small hydroelectric power plants (small HPPs) with an installed capacity of 243.366 MW and an average yearly electricity production of 737.38 GWh are installed in the country.  In 2006, the small HPPs produced 166.6 GWh of electricity.

Wind

Solar

Geothermal 
Armenia is constructing the Jermaghbyur Geothermal Power Plant which will be the country's largest geothermal power plant having an installed electric capacity of 150 MW.

See also 

 Economy of Armenia
 Electricity sector in Armenia
 Ministry of Energy Infrastructures and Natural Resources
 Renewable energy in Armenia

Notes

External links 

 Armenian Nuclear power plant
 Ministry of Energy and Natural Resources of Armenia
 Public Services Regulatory Commission of The Republic of Armenia  (statistics on electricity generation & consumption, natural gas consumption, and thermal energy generation)
 Hrazdan Energy Company 

 
Economy of Armenia